National Route 1C is a 17.3 km long road running west–east in Khanh Hoa province, starting at the Ri Ri Pass in Vinh Luong Commune, Nha Trang City, and ending at Thanh T-junction, Dien town, Dien Khanh district. Route 1C was the main route of Route 1A before it was rerouted to bypass Nha Trang.

References 

National routes in Vietnam